The Poor Employment Act 1817 (officially the Public Works Loans Act 1817), 57 Geo 3 c 34 was an act passed by the Parliament of the United Kingdom.

The act was passed in order "to authorise the issue of Exchequer Bills and the Advance of Money out of the Consolidated Fund, to a limited Amount, for the carrying on of Public Works and Fisheries in the United Kingdom and Employment of the Poor in Great Britain".

Under the act, the Exchequer Bill Loan Commission was set up to help finance public work projects that would generate employment.

See also
Exchequer Bill Loan Commission

References

United Kingdom Acts of Parliament 1817
English Poor Laws
1817 in the United Kingdom